Eulepetopsis vitrea is a species of sea snail, a true limpet, a marine gastropod mollusk in the family Neolepetopsidae, one of the families of true limpets.

Eulepetopsis vitrea is the only species in the genus Eulepetopsis.

Description

Distribution
Galapagos Rift and the East Pacific Rise

Habitat 
hydrothermal vents

References

External links

Neolepetopsidae
Gastropods described in 1990